Canale Villoresi is a canal in Italy; it was the brainchild of Lombardy engineer Eugenio Villoresi.

Construction began in 1877, but Villoresi himself died two years later. The works were completed in 1890 by a consortium.

Irrigation was the canal's main reason for being but the addition of locks enabled cargoes of sand to be carried along it.

Further reading

See also
 Villoresi Park

Sister projects

Canals in Lombardy
Waterways of Italy
Transport in Lombardy
Canals opened in 1890